The following is the family tree of the Malay monarchs of Negeri Sembilan, from the establishment of the chieftaincy in 1773 until present day. The monarch is styled Yang di-Pertuan Besar or shortened as Yamtuan Besar ('the grand ruler'). The first three monarchs namely, Melewar, Hitam and Lenggang were hailed from Pagaruyung in Sumatra, and were invited to rule the confederacy of Minangkabau Luaks of Negeri Sembilan. The accession of the locally-born Radin marked the end of the practice of inviting princes from Pagaruyung.

References

Bibliography
 
 .

Negeri Sembilan